Singles match may refer to:

Matches involving two players competing one-on-one in sports such as;
Singles (tennis)
Singles (pickleball)
Singles match (professional wrestling)
Singles match play in golf

See also
Dating, a stage of a romantic relationship